Kabir-Kazmalyar is a rural locality (a selo) and the administrative centre of Kabir-Kazmalyarsky Selsoviet, Magaramkentsky District, Republic of Dagestan, Russia. The population was 2,189 as of 2010. There are 36 streets.

Geography 
Kabir-Kazmalyar is located between Novo-Filya and Chakhchakh-Kazmalyar, 25 km northeast of Magaramkent (the district's administrative centre) by road. Gazardkam-Kazmalyar and Filya are the nearest rural localities.

Nationalities 
Lezgins live there.

References 

Rural localities in Magaramkentsky District